Ayub National Stadium, formerly known as the Baluchistan Cricket Association Ground, is a multi-purpose stadium in Quetta, Pakistan. It is used for football and cricket  matches. The first One Day International (ODI) cricket match between Pakistan and India was held at this ground in 1978. The stadium can hold 20,000 people. Most of the friendly matches are hosted in this stadium as it is superior to many other football grounds in Pakistan. It is located next to the 10,000-capacity Ayub Football Stadium.

The stadium has hosted two ODI cricket matches, one in 1978, and the other in 1984. In both of these matches, Pakistan faced India.

Stats

See also
 List of stadiums in Pakistan
 List of cricket grounds in Pakistan
 List of sports venues in Karachi
 List of sports venues in Lahore
 List of sports venues in Faisalabad

References

Football venues in Pakistan
Quetta
Stadiums in Pakistan
Multi-purpose stadiums in Pakistan
Cricket grounds in Pakistan
Sport in Balochistan, Pakistan